Ocean Boulevard may refer to:

 Florida State Road A1A, a road
 New Hampshire Route 1A, a road
 South Carolina Highway 73, a road
 461 Ocean Boulevard, an Eric Clapton album
 Did You Know That There's a Tunnel Under Ocean Blvd, a Lana Del Rey album